U.S. Route 19 Alternate is a  former section of U.S. Route 19 from St. Petersburg, Florida to Holiday.

Beginning at the intersection of 4th Street N (US 92 and SR 687 and 5th Avenue N in St. Petersburg, Florida, it runs west of US 19 near the Gulf coast passing through the cities of Seminole, Clearwater, Dunedin and Tarpon Springs before ending at US 19 in Holiday, Pasco County, Florida.  It is also the unsigned State Road 595 throughout the entire route.  It also runs along much of the Pinellas Trail.

Route description

History

Alternate US 19 was established in 1951 when US 19 was realigned from St. Petersburg through Holiday.  It hugs the Gulf coast, servicing Seminole, Clearwater, Dunedin and Tarpon Springs before ending at US 19 in Holiday.  Originally, the southern terminus of US Alt 19 was at US 92/SR 687 in downtown St. Petersburg, but was truncated to US 19 in St. Petersburg.

As of September 2007, however, signage indicates that Alt US 19 once again follows US 19's old route all the way to US 92; this original route was numbered and signed as the hidden SR 595 designation of the main route, but the signs are slowly being phased out in favor of Alt US 19 shields.  Both shields are in current use, however, for the time being, with the Alt US 19 signage on the highway itself, and the SR 595 directional signage at the intersections, including I-275 exit 23.

Realignment in Clearwater / Largo

Prior to February 2007, Alt. US 19 originally went south through downtown Clearwater on Fort Harrison Avenue, which becomes Clearwater-Largo Road upon entering Largo. It then turned east along West Bay Drive to the intersection of Seminole Boulevard, then turned south. This intersection is also the western terminus of SR 686 and, until the reconfiguration, the southern terminus of SR 651.

As of February 2007, Alt. US 19 was realigned along Missouri Ave., directly north to SR 60 (Court/Chestnut Streets) in Clearwater, west to Myrtle Avenue, then north, before joining Fort Harrison Avenue south of Sunset Point Road. The new alignment now effectively bypasses the downtowns of Largo and Clearwater. The original alignment has since been decommissioned by the FDOT and transferred to the cities of Largo and Clearwater. SR 651 still exists in FDOT's road inventory lists, but as a "hidden" route number along the new Alt. US 19 alignment.

When this plan was first announced in 2001, it was viewed as good news for commuters and businesses championing the project as a way to turn Clearwater into a walkable community.

Proposed expressways

The planned St. Petersburg-Clearwater Expressway, or Pinellas Beltway, proposed in 1974, would have followed the current alignment of US Alt 19 from I-275 to Clearwater.  A freeway revolt cancelled the beltway by 1980. The intersection of Seminole Boulevard and Bay Pines Boulevard at State Road 666 is a remnant of this proposed road.

Major intersections

State-County Roads 595

Two extensions of the "hidden State Road 595" exist beyond Alternate US 19. The first one is between US 19 and US 92 in Downtown St. Petersburg, though this is being phased out, as signage indicates that Alt US 19 now ends at US 92 instead of US 19. The other is a brief multiplex with US 19 in Holiday which terminates a block north of the northern terminus of Alternate US 19 in Holiday at Mile Stretch Road. County Road 595 consists of Mile Stretch Road, then takes a sharp left onto Grand Boulevard. Within Holiday and Elfers, the road runs along the right-of-way of a former railroad line before heading to Main Street in New Port Richey, where it secretly makes another left turn before terminating at US 19. County Road 595 can be found again between Hudson and Aripeka, where it crosses the Pasco-Hernando County Line along the Gulf of Mexico on its way towards Hernando Beach, only to bypass downtown Hernando Beach and terminate once again with US 19, but this time also with the western terminus of CR 574/Spring Hill Drive.

References

External links

Alternate US 19 (SouthEastRoads.com) (AARoads.com).

Alternate, St. Petersburg
19 Alternate Florida St. Petersburg
U.S. Highways in Florida
Roads in St. Petersburg, Florida
Roads in Pinellas County, Florida
Roads in Pasco County, Florida
1951 establishments in Florida